Artyomovsky District is an administrative district (raion), one of the thirty in Sverdlovsk Oblast, Russia. As a municipal division, it is incorporated as Artyomovsky Urban Okrug. Its administrative center is the town of Artyomovsky. Population (excluding the administrative center): 27,017 (2010 Census);

References

Notes

Sources

Districts of Sverdlovsk Oblast